Nagarawardhani was the niece of King Majapahit, Hayam Wuruk, and was the daughter of the King's sister, Isywari, also known as Bhre Pajang.

Nagarawardhani was later married to Bhre Wirabhumi, also the son of King Hayam Wuruk whose mother was one of the royal concubines. Nagarawardhani also known as Be Laem Alemu, which means flat in Bhre Lasem. The story of Nagarawardhani and her husband, Bhre Wirabuhmi, is told in the book Nagarakretagama, and in Pararaton.

Nagarawardhani lived in the days of Bubat War when Hayam Wuruk fought against the Kingdom of Padjadjaran to compete for Padjadjaran princess, Dyah Pitaloka. After Hayam Wuruk died, the struggle for the throne continued between Wikramawardhana and Nagarawardhani's husband, Bhre Wirabhumi in the Regreg war. The war concluded when Wikramawardhana became King of Majapahit and reunited the Majapahit kingdom.

References

14th-century Indonesian women
Indonesian royalty
Majapahit